Cyclomancy is a form of divination based on spinning an object and deriving predictions or conclusions from the object's final resting direction.  In some traditions, a wheel or top is spun on a surface marked with letters or symbols, and those that fall closest to the device's pointer are consulted.  In other traditions, any suitable object may be spun and its direction may be used to obtain a simple yes/no answer or directional indicator. For example, an object with a distinguishing feature may be spun between two diverging paths or disparate objects, and the one closest to the feature is chosen. The party game Spin the Bottle is loosely based on this concept.

Cyclomancy is sometimes used in dowsing.

References

Divination
Paranormal terminology